Dan River Navigation System in North Carolina Thematic Resources includes a set of historic wing dams, sluices, and hauling walls located near Eden, Madison, and Wentworth, Rockingham County, North Carolina. They were built between about 1823 and 1890 to improve navigation on the Dan River.

Components

The 11 components of the thematic resources listing were added on the National Register of Historic Places in 1984.

They are:
 Cross Rock Rapid Sluice
 Dead Timber Ford Sluices
 Eagle Falls Sluice
 Gravel Shoals Sluice
 Jacob's Creek Landing
 Mayo River Sluice
 Roberson's Fish Trap Shoal Sluice
 Slink Shoal Sluice and Wing Dams
 Tanyard Shoal Sluice
 Three Ledges Shoal Sluice
 Wide Mouth Shoal Sluice

References

Industrial buildings and structures on the National Register of Historic Places in North Carolina
Buildings and structures completed in 1890
Buildings and structures in Rockingham County, North Carolina
National Register of Historic Places in Rockingham County, North Carolina
National Register of Historic Places Multiple Property Submissions
Water transportation on the National Register of Historic Places